The 1999 Derbyshire Dales District Council election took place on 6 May 1999 to elect members of Derbyshire Dales District Council in Derbyshire, England. The whole council was up for election and the Conservative party gained overall control of the council from no overall control.

Election result

By-elections between 1999 and 2003

Calver

Taddington

References 

1999
1999 English local elections
1990s in Derbyshire